Charles R. Gerow is a Republican Party political strategist who is the CEO of Quantum Communications, a Harrisburg, Pennsylvania-based public relations and public affairs firm.

Career
Gerow holds a J.D. degree from Villanova University School of Law and has been a Pennsylvania attorney for over 40 years. Gerow began his career on the campaign staff of President Ronald Reagan and continued to do political work for President Reagan throughout the next 25 years. He was an Alternate Delegate At Large at the 1988 Republican National Convention, elected as a Delegate to the 2004, 2012, and 2020 Republican National Conventions and an Alternate Delegate to the 2016 Republican National Convention. He has attended every Republican National Convention since 1976.

Gerow is a prominent Republican Party political strategist. In 2010, Politics magazine named him one of the most influential Republicans in Pennsylvania.

Gerow is one of five Pennsylvania Republicans recognized in the prestigious Influencers 500 by Campaigns and Elections magazine. He's also been named One of the Top 50 Republican Influencers in Pennsylvania by Politics magazine and as one of the Top Ten Political Consultants in Pennsylvania by PA2010.com. Charlie serves on the board of directors of the American Conservative Union, the nation's largest and most prestigious conservative organization and the sponsor of CPAC, the Freedoms Foundation at Valley Forge and the American Swiss Foundation.

In 1989, he helped to found the Pennsylvania Leadership Conference. During the 1996 presidential election, Gerow was a surrogate speaker for Bob Dole. In 1998, Gerow was a candidate in the 1998 Republican primary to represent Pennsylvania's 19th congressional district, where he lost to incumbent William F. Goodling. In 2000, he was a candidate in the 2000 Republican primary to represent Pennsylvania's 19th congressional district, where he lost to Todd Russell Platts.

President George W. Bush appointed Gerow to the Benjamin Franklin Tercentenary Commission, and Pennsylvania Governor Tom Corbett appointed Gerow to the Governor's Advisory Council on Privatization and Innovation in 2011.

Gerow serves as the First Vice Chairman of the American Conservative Union, and sits on the boards of the Freedoms Foundation at Valley Forge and the American Swiss Foundation. He also serves on the board of the Matthew J. Ryan Center at Villanova University.

He has taught as an adjunct professor at Lebanon Valley College, Dickinson College and Gettysburg College. He works as a political analyst for WHP-TV (CBS 21) in Harrisburg, Pennsylvania. He regularly hosts radio talk shows and has appeared as a commentator on CBS, NBC, ABC, Fox News, MSNBC, CNBC, Fox Business and several national radio programs.

Involvement in fake electors plot
Following President Donald Trump's defeat in the 2020 presidential election, Gerow signed documents along with other Republicans attesting that they were a slate of alternate electors who would vote for Trump in the electoral college. However, the plot Gerow was involved in was illegitimate, and Pennsylvania's legal electors voted for Joe Biden.

2021 car crash 
On July 21, 2021, Gerow was driving along the Pennsylvania Turnpike in Tredyffrin Township, Chester County when his vehicle was struck by a motorcycle. The motorcyclist was killed. Gerow's campaign for Pennsylvania governor said that he was cooperating with Pennsylvania State Police investigators. Witnesses said that Gerow's car was seen driving down the highway with a motorcycle embedded in its grille for several miles before state police eventually pulled Gerow over. 

A lawyer for Gerow said that the motorcyclist was involved in a crash with a different vehicle and had been stopped in a Turnpike lane, and said Gerow did not cause the crash.

2022 Pennsylvania gubernatorial bid 

In June 2021, Gerow announced his campaign for Governor of Pennsylvania in 2022. He lost the Republican primary election with only 18,000 votes, placing eighth.

See also
Stolen Honor
QubeTV

References

Living people
People from Harrisburg, Pennsylvania
American newspaper reporters and correspondents
Political activists from Pennsylvania
Pennsylvania political journalists
Villanova University School of Law alumni
Candidates in the 2000 United States elections
Pennsylvania Republicans
Year of birth missing (living people)